Pramesh Kumar Hamal is a Nepalese politician belonging to CPN (Unified Socialist). He is also the Vice-president of the party.

Formerly, a member of the CPN (UML), Hamal entered politics in 1976. He has served in diplomatic posts at various point of time.

References 

Living people
Nepalese diplomats
Communist Party of Nepal (Unified Socialist) politicians
Ambassadors of Nepal to Belgium
Ambassadors of Nepal to the Netherlands
Ambassadors of Nepal to Luxembourg
Ambassadors of Nepal to the European Union
Permanent Representatives of Nepal to the Organisation for the Prohibition of Chemical Weapons
Year of birth missing (living people)